Sapindus rarak is a species of soapberry. Its species name is derived from the Malaysian name rerak or rerek. In Indonesia it is commonly known as lerak or klerek.

Description

Use
Sapindus rarak is a timber tree but the wood is not durable. Its fruits and seeds are used as buttons and beads. In Indonesia, the fruit are used to make a traditional soap for washing clothes, especially batik. Unlike many commercial detergents, it does not cause the colours to fade.

References

rarak
Trees of China
Trees of the Indian subcontinent
Trees of Indo-China
Trees of Malesia
Trees of Taiwan